The 1999 World Table Tennis Championships were held in Eindhoven from August 2 to August 8, 1999. The Championships were originally scheduled from April 26 to May 9 in Belgrade, Yugoslavia but were postponed after the NATO bombing of Yugoslavia during the Kosovo War in March 1999. Individual events were relocated to Eindhoven and team competitions were moved to Kuala Lumpur in 2000.

Results

References

External links
ITTF Museum

 
World Table Tennis Championships
World Table Tennis Championships
World Table Tennis Championships
Table tennis competitions in the Netherlands
Table
August 1999 sports events in Europe
Sports competitions in Eindhoven
20th century in Eindhoven
1999 in Malaysian sport
International sports competitions hosted by Malaysia
August 1999 sports events in Asia